"Brilliant Mistake" is a song written and performed by new wave musician Elvis Costello that was first released on his 1986 album King of America. Written about Costello's experiences in America, the song features introspective lyrics and a performance from the Confederates, who performed on the track after his usual backing band the Attractions could not perform to Costello's liking.

Released on King of America as the opening track, the song has since seen positive reception from critics and has appeared on compilation albums.

Background
Costello first came up with the title of "Brilliant Mistake" in a conversation with David Was of Was (Not Was), who Costello had collaborated with to write "Shadows And Jimmy" for the latter's 1988 album What Up, Dog?. They had been discussing Costello's experiences in America; he later described the track as "about being deluded or imagining a life in exile".

Lyrically, the song continues what Costello describes as continuing the "theme of exile and a simultaneous attraction and repulsion to an ideal" that he cites as defining the King of America album. The song also contains the title lyric for its parent album, King of America; in the song, the "King" falls in love with a woman who works "for the ABC News / It was as much of the alphabet as she knew how to use". Costello later explained the song's meaning,

Recording
"Brilliant Mistake" was first attempted by Costello in his sessions with his longstanding backing band the Attractions. Costello had already recorded half of the King of America album without them, rendering the recording sessions tense. Costello had expected for the Attractions to perform on the song, but he expressed disappointment with their performance, saying, "I had little patience for our failure to get to grips with the one song I had been certain would suit the band's sound and was fast becoming the session's theme song: 'Brilliant Mistake'. ... Despite any other departures, I wanted to lead off with an Attractions recording. This was not to be".

The final version would be recorded with the Confederates, Costello's backing band throughout the album that included members of the TCB Band. Drummer Mickey Curry played with brushes on the track, while Jerry Scheff played string bass and future Costello producer Mitchell Froom played organ and harpsichord. T-Bone Wolk, played Fender Telecaster and accordion.

Release and reception
"Brilliant Mistake" was released as the opening track to the King of America album in May 1985. Costello explained, "Apart from the lyric providing the album's title, I had always seen this song as the record's opening track". The track was not initially released as a single, but it saw a single release in 2005 with a cover of Buddy Holly's "True Love Ways" on the B-side. The track also appeared on Girls Girls Girls, of which he joked, "At best ['Brilliant Mistake'] might be called the title track of the collection".

"Brilliant Mistake" has since seen critical acclaim. Pitchfork Media praised the song as one of the songs on the album "imbued" with "barbed wit and acid humor", while AllMusic noted that Costello "rarely got better" than on the track. Salon dubbed it "a hugely ambitious song that eviscerates, in vertiginous order, the American way of life, romance and then the singer's personality itself". Ed Masley of The Arizona Republic called it "prime Costello, a reflective gem".

Jim Beviglia of American Songwriter named it Costello's 13th best song, saying Brilliant Mistake' may indeed be an affectionate send-up of the land of the free, but it’s also a moving portrait of a man lost in translation". Dave Lifton of Ultimate Classic Rock ranked it as Costello's 8th best, while Martin Chilton of the Daily Telegraph named it his 17th best.

The song was also the title track for the Broadway tribute "Brilliant Mistake: Broadway Sings Elvis Costello".

References
Citations

Sources

Elvis Costello songs
1986 songs
2005 singles
Songs written by Elvis Costello
Song recordings produced by T Bone Burnett